The 1994–95 Scottish Challenge Cup was the fifth season of the competition, which was also known as the B&Q Cup for sponsorship reasons. It was competed for by the 30 member clubs of the Scottish Football League. The previous champions were Falkirk, who defeated St Mirren 3–0 in the 1993 final.

The final was played on 6 November 1994, between Dundee and Airdrieonians at McDiarmid Park in Perth. Airdrieonians won 3–2 after extra time, to win the tournament for the first time.

Schedule

First round 
Caledonian Thistle and Greenock Morton received random byes into the second round.

Source: SFL

Second round 

Source: SFL

Quarter-finals

Semi-finals

Final

References

External links 
 Scottish Football League Scottish Challenge Cup on Scottish Football League website
 Soccerbase Scottish League Challenge Cup on Soccerbase.com
 ESPN Soccernet  Scottish League Challenge Cup homepage on ESPN Soccernet
 BBC Sport – Scottish Cups Challenge Cup on BBC Sport

Scottish Challenge Cup seasons
Challenge Cup
Scottish Challenge Cup